Pterospora, commonly known as pinedrops, woodland pinedrops, Albany beechdrops, or giant bird's nest is a North American genus in the subfamily Monotropoideae of the heath family, and includes only the species Pterospora andromedea. It grows as a mycoheterotroph in coniferous or mixed forests. It is widespread across much of Canada as well as the western and northeastern United States to and northern Mexico (Sonora, Coahuila, Durango, Nuevo León and Baja California). Along with Monotropa it is one of the more frequently encountered genera of the Monotropoideae.

The genus name is derived from the morphology of the seeds which have narrow flaps of tissue on the side and therefore appear winged: pteron (Gr.) = wing, spora (Gr.) = seed. The specific name andromedea derives from the resemblance of the flowers to those of another genus in the Ericaceae, Andromeda.

The above-ground stalks (inflorescences) are usually found in small clusters between June and August. The inflorescences are hairy and noticeably sticky to the touch. This is caused by the presence of hairs which exude a sticky substance (glandular hairs). The inflorescences are covered by scale-like structures known as bracts. The upper portion of the inflorescence has a series of yellowish, urn-shaped flowers that face downward. The fruit is a capsule. Plants exist for most of their life as a mass of brittle, but fleshy, roots.

Pterospora has consistently been shown to be more closely related to Sarcodes than any other member of the Monotropoideae.

Fungal Interactions 
P. andromedea, like all members of Monotropoideae, is a mycoheterotroph. This is a form of carbon acquisition that is parasitic on fungal organisms and epiparastic of photosynthetic plants which are symbionts to the fungal host. Because P. andromedea is achlorophyllous this relationship is an obligate symbiosis for it, but is not ubiquitous in the fungal host. All monotropoideae are host specific to a select few fungal counterparts which in turn makes them specific to the photosynthetic organism associated with their fungal host. In the case of P. andromedea fungal host specificity leans heavily towards Rhizopogon salebrosus in the western distribution and Rhizopogon kretzerae in the eastern distribution but broadly seems to be ubiquitous symbionts with Rhizopogon subgenus Amylopogon. Rhizopogon species also exhibit high host specificity and sub-genus Amylopogon is primarily associated with the Pinus genus. Fungal exoenzymatic activity has been shown to be required for seed germination of P. andromedea however the requisite enzymes are not exclusively produced within subgenus Amylopogon indicating that seed colonization by fungi outside of the observed host specificity is possible however ecologically restricted by some currently unknown mechanism.

See also
 Corallorhiza

References

External links

Calflora: Pterospora andromedea
Jepson Manual (TJM2) Treatment
New England Plant Conservation Program: Pterospora andromedea Nutt.
University of Washington, Burke Museum
Calphotos Photo gallery, University of California
photo of herbarium specimen at Missouri Botanical Garden, collected in Coahuila in 1990

Monotropoideae
Monotypic Ericaceae genera
Flora of Canada
Flora of the Northeastern United States
Flora of the Northwestern United States
Flora of the Southwestern United States
Flora of California
Flora of the Great Lakes region (North America)
Flora of the Rocky Mountains
Flora of the Sierra Nevada (United States)
Parasitic plants
Flora of Northwestern Mexico
Flora without expected TNC conservation status